The New Guinea snake-necked turtle (Chelodina novaeguineae) is a species of turtle in the family Chelidae. The species is found almost exclusively within Western Province, Papua New Guinea.

Habitat
C. novaeguineae inhabits small and large freshwater bodies of water, jungle rivers with ample vegetation.

Description
The carapace is dark brown, almost black, but shows some variation from "normal" turtle patterns. The plastron is a light brown, tan color. C. novaeguineae has a long neck, which (including the head) can sometimes exceed the length of the carapace. The skin is mostly gray, except for black on the head, and white on the underparts.

Behavior
When resting, C. novaeguineae twists its long neck off to the side for protection. The highly flexible neck permits foraging in mud as well as snorkeling. It also allows the turtle to strike quickly to capture prey.

Reproduction
The New Guinea snake-necked turtle is oviparous. 17–21 eggs are laid and incubation lasts 75–110 days depending on temperature.

References

External links

 http://www.hoglezoo.org/meet_our_animals/animal_finder/New_Guinea_Snake_neck_Turtle.

Chelodina
Reptiles described in 1888
Taxonomy articles created by Polbot
Turtles of Australia